Magic in Your Eyes is the fourth studio album by Earl Klugh released in 1978. Chet Atkins, whom Klugh considers to be one of his main influences, is featured on the song "Good Time Charlie's Got the Blues".

Track listing 
 "Magic in Your Eyes" (Earl Klugh) – 4:55
 "Alicia" (Klugh) – 4:31
 "Julie" (Klugh) – 4:32
 "Lode Star" (Greg Phillinganes) – 4:47
 "Cast Your Fate to the Wind" (Vince Guaraldi) – 4:40 
 "Rose Hips" (Klugh) – 2:46
 "Good Time Charlie's Got the Blues" (Danny O'Keefe) – 4:29
 "Mayaguez" (Klugh) – 3:37
 "Cry a Little While" (Klugh) – 3:23

Personnel

Musicians
Earl Klugh – acoustic guitar
Chet Atkins – acoustic guitar, track 7
Lloyd Green – steel guitar, tracks 3, 7, 9
Scott Edwards – bass, tracks 1, 2, 4-6, 8
Hubie Crawford – bass, tracks 3, 7, 9
Gene Dunlap – drums, percussion
Paulinho da Costa – castanets, track 5
Darryl Dybka – Rhodes piano, track 3
Greg Phillinganes – Rhodes piano, piano, synthesizer, tracks 1-2, 4-8
Booker T. Jones – string arrangements, tracks 1, 3, 5, 7, 9

Technical
Booker T. Jones – producer
Jim Nipar – engineer (Sound Factory) tracks 1-6, 8
Serge Reyes – assistant engineer (Sound Factory) tracks 1-6, 8
Bill Vandervort – engineer (Music City Music Hall, C.A. Workshop) tracks 7,9

Charts

References 

1978 albums
Earl Klugh albums
Albums produced by Booker T. Jones
Blue Note Records albums